I Owe It All to You is an album by Welsh singer Shirley Bassey, released on 6 November 2020 by Decca Records. It contains a mix of new songs and cover versions "handpicked to reflect her incredible life and career". Bassey said of the album, "My new album is a celebration of 70 years in showbiz. 70 years of support from my fans and 70 years of music! I've trodden the boards of many stages and kicked up many a diamante heel! The songs I have chosen all feel very personal and connected to my life. I hope they will do the same for my fans."

"Look But Don’t Touch" and the title track "I Owe It All to You" are the album's original compositions. Prior to this studio version, "You Ain't Heard Nothing Yet" was only available on the video Live – You Ain't Heard Nothing Yet (1986). Bassey previously recorded "Who Wants to Live Forever" for her 1995 Sings the Movies album.

I Owe It All to You entered the Top 5 of the UK Albums Chart, making Bassey "the first female artist to claim a Top 40 album in seven consecutive decades."

Track listing

Personnel
Adapted from the album's liner notes.

Musicians
Shirley Bassey – vocals
Don Richardson – bass guitar
Ian Thomas – drums
John Parricelli – guitar
Rob Mounsey – piano, orchestral arranger
Dominic Ferris – piano (tracks 6, 7 & 14), piano rehearsals pianist & music preparation
Toby Chapman – keyboards, background vocals (tracks 2 & 8), programming
Michael Alexander – conductor, musical director
Mikel Toms – orchestra contractor
Czech Studio Orchestra – orchestra
Ade Halloween, Alistair White, Andy Wood, Chris Dean – trombones
Dave Bishop, Graeme Blevins, Howard McGill, Jamie Talbot, Martin Williams – saxophones
Louis Dowdeswell, Paul Spong, Ryan Quigley, Simon Gardener – trumpets
Andy Caine, Gabriella Bishop, Gina Foster – background vocals (tracks 2 & 8)

Production
Produced by Nick Patrick
Executive producer: Jenny Meredith
Engineered by Michal Petrasek & Pavel Ridosko
Mix engineer: Pete Schwier
Mastering engineer: Tony Cousins
Recorded at Arts & Music Studios, Italy; Czech Television Studios, Czech Republic; Master Chord Studios, UK
Mixed at Shine Studio, UK
Mastered at Metropolis Mastering, UK
A&R coordination: Karyn Hughes, Alex O'Hara
Marketing: Murray Rose
Product co-ordinator: Nico Rooney
Photography by Matt Hollyoak
Styling by Cheryl Konteh
Hair & make up by Nikki Hambi

Charts

References

Shirley Bassey albums
2020 albums
Decca Records albums
Albums produced by Nick Patrick (record producer)